Andrés Fernandez de Ipenza (died 1643) was a Roman Catholic prelate who served as Bishop-Elect of Yucatán (1643).

Biography
On 9 Feb 1643, he was selected by the King of Spain and confirmed by Pope Urban VIII on 5 Oct 1643 as Bishop of Yucatán.
He died on 24 Oct 1643 before he was installed to the bishopric.

References

External links and additional sources
 (for Chronology of Bishops) 
 (for Chronology of Bishops) 

17th-century Roman Catholic bishops in Mexico
Bishops appointed by Pope Urban VIII
1643 deaths